Wang Zhongqi (29 June 1932 – 25 December 2022) was a Chinese engineer who was a professor at Harbin Institute of Technology, and an academician of the Chinese Academy of Engineering.

Biography
Wang was born in Tang County, Hebei, on 29 June 1932. His uncle  was a Communist politician. His elder sister Wang Kun was an opera singer. He attended Shanxi-Chahar-Hebei Frontline United Middle School (now Beijing 101 Middle School). In 1952, he entered Harbin Institute of Technology, where he graduated in 1956. In October 1960, he was sent to study at Moscow Power Engineering Institute at the expense of the Communist government, obtaining his vice-doctorate in October 1962.

Wang began his academic career at Harbin Institute of Technology in 1957. At the institute, he eventually became professor in 1999. He also served as chief engineer at the Northeast China Municipal Engineering Design Institute between January 1985 and December 1998.

On 25 December 2022, Wang died in Harbin, Heilongjiang, at the age of 90, from COVID-19.

Honours and awards
 1994 State Natural Science Award (Second Class) 
 1997 Member of the Chinese Academy of Engineering (CAE)
 2001 State Science and Technology Progress Award (Second Class)

References

1932 births
2022 deaths
People from Baoding
Engineers from Hebei
Harbin Institute of Technology alumni
Moscow Power Engineering Institute alumni
Academic staff of Harbin Institute of Technology
Members of the Chinese Academy of Engineering
20th-century Chinese engineers
21st-century Chinese engineers
Deaths from the COVID-19 pandemic in China